Akaga Glacier is the 5.7 km long and 2.2 km wide glacier on Nordenskjöld Coast in Graham Land situated south of Sinion Glacier and north of the glacier featuring Arrol Icefall.  It drains the southeast slopes of Detroit Plateau, flows east-southeastwards and enters Odrin Bay in Weddell Sea.  The feature is named after the Bulgar woman ruler Akaga (6th century).

Location
British mapping in 1978.

See also
 List of glaciers in the Antarctic
 Glaciology

Maps
 British Antarctic Territory.  Scale 1:200000 topographic map.  DOS 610 Series, Sheet W 64 60.  Directorate of Overseas Surveys, Tolworth, UK, 1978.
 Antarctic Digital Database (ADD). Scale 1:250000 topographic map of Antarctica. Scientific Committee on Antarctic Research (SCAR). Since 1993, regularly upgraded and updated.

External links
 Akaga Glacier SCAR Composite Antarctic Gazetteer
 Bulgarian Antarctic Gazetteer Antarctic Place-names Commission (Bulgarian)
 Basic data (English)

External links
 Akaga Glacier. Copernix satellite image

Glaciers of Nordenskjöld Coast
Bulgaria and the Antarctic